The men's light welterweight (63 kg/138.6 lbs) Thai-Boxing division at the W.A.K.O. European Championships 2006 in Skopje was the fifth lightest of the male Thai-Boxing tournaments involving eight fighters.  Each of the matches was three rounds of two minutes each and were fought under Thai-Boxing rules.

The tournament gold medal was won by Yury Zhvokovski from Belarus who defeated Russian Sergey Solomennokov in the final by split decision.  Defeated semi finalists Stanislav Ushakov and Michele Iezzi from Russia and Italy respectively had to make do with bronze medals.

Results

Key

See also
List of WAKO Amateur European Championships
List of WAKO Amateur World Championships
List of male kickboxers

References

External links
 WAKO World Association of Kickboxing Organizations Official Site

W.A.K.O. European Championships 2006 (Skopje)